The Big Brother Awards (the Winston Awards) for the United Kingdom

2008
A single Big Brother award was won by New Labour.

2008 Winston Awards
 Baroness Sarah Ludford
 Phil Booth, National Coordinator of NO2ID
 Helen Wallace, Executive Director of GeneWatch UK
 Gareth Crossman, retiring Director of Policy at Liberty.
 Becky Hogge, retiring Executive Director of the Open Rights Group.
 David Davis

2005

2004

2003
The 2003 awards went to:
Ken Livingstone—Worst Civil Servant
Capita—Most invasive company
PIU Data Sharing Report—Most appalling project
Association of Chief Police Officers(ACPO)—Most heinous government organisation.
Tony Blair—Lifetime menace
David Blunkett—"Dog Poo On A Stick" prize

2003 Winston Awards
Posthumously, to Dr Roger Needham
Teri Dowty, Joint national coordinator, Childrens Rights Alliance for England and Wales
Marion Chester, Legal Director, Association of Community Health Councils of England and Wales
Stand insurance blog
Richard Norton-Taylor and Stuart Millar of The Guardian
Undercurrents

2002
The 2002 awards went to:
Sir Richard Wilson—Worst Civil Servant
Norwich Union—Most invasive company
The National Criminal Intelligence Service (NCIS)—Most appalling project
The Department for Education and Skills—Most heinous government organisation.
The national identification and data sharing scheme—Lifetime menace

2002 Winston Awards
Maurice Frankel, director of the Campaign for Freedom of Information.
Andrew Phillips, Baron Phillips of Sudbury
The Daily Telegraph'''s "Free Country Campaign".
Ilka Schroder a German Greens Member of the European Parliament
David Shayler

2000
The 2000 awards were made on 4 December and went to:
The National DNA Database—Most Invasive Proposal
Envision Licensing Ltd—Most Invasive Company (for TV licensing)
Javier Solana—Security-General of Council of European Union
The NHS Executive—Most Heinous Government Organisation
Jack Straw—Lifetime Menace

2000 Winston Awards
Professor Jason Ditton
The Rt Hon the Lord Cope of Berkeley
The Manufacturing, Science and Finance Union
Caspar Bowden
Ben Rooney

1999

1998 (first year)
The 1998 awards went to:

 Corporation: Procurement Services International for selling surveillance equipment to Nigeria, Turkey and Indonesia, three countries whose human rights records have been severely criticised.
 Local government: Newham Council in London won for using its 140 street cameras and facial recognition software to try to pick out criminals in crowds.
 National government: Department of Trade and Industry (DTI) over its plans for the police to have access through a third party to the keys to any information sent electronically that was locked by encryption.
 Product: Software by Harlequin that examines telephone records and is able to compare numbers dialled in order to group users into 'friendship networks' won this category. It avoids the legal requirements needed for phone tapping.
 Lifetime achievement award:'' Menwith Hill in Yorkshire, a listening station used by America's National Security Agency and described as the biggest US spy station in the world, won this special award.

1998 Winston Awards
 SchNEWS a Brighton-based weekly newsletter
 Lindis Percy, a Quaker, who attempts to raise awareness of the activities of the United States National Security Agency, particularly relating to Menwith Hill, (joint coordinator of the Campaign for the Accountability of American Bases)
 Alan Lodge a Nottingham photographer who spent a decade raising awareness of Police surveillance activities, particularly the practice of photographing demonstrators, activists and minority groups.

See also
Privacy International

References

Privacy awards
Ironic and humorous awards
British awards
Nineteen Eighty-Four
1998 establishments in the United Kingdom
Awards established in 1998
Awards disestablished in 2008